The Lithuanian Football Federation Cup, also known as Hegelmann LFF Cup for sponsorship reasons, is a Lithuanian football cup competition contested in a knockout tournament format.  The winner of the cup gains entitlement to participate in the Lithuanian Supercup as well as the UEFA Europa Conference League.

The clubs of A Lyga, I Lyga, II Lyga, III Lyga and IV Lyga are eligible to compete. The competition format is a single-elimination tournament.

The competition was sponsored by Sharp in 2018-2019, and by Hegelmann in 2020.

History

Interwar period 
The first cup tournament in Lithuania took place in 1924 and was called the "Kooperacijos taurė". It took place during the International Cooperation Day event. "Kooperacijos taurė" competition took place three times - 1924, 1925 and 1926. Other cup competitions took place at the same time as well - "Žiemos taurė" (lith. Winter Cup) in 1925, "Pavasario taurė" (lith. Spring Cup) in 1926 and 1927, as well as once-off cup events.

Post-war period 
After the World War II, in soviet Lithuania a cup competition was established by the initiative of Tiesa newspaper in 1947, and was called The Tiesa Cup. It consisted of Lithuanian SSR teams not competing in the Soviet football league pyramid.

Re-established Independence to present 
Since the regained independence in 1990 the competition is called the Lithuanian Football Federation Cup.

Finals

Performance by club

Winners

Finalists without Wins

Clubs currently playing in A Lyga are shown in Bold. 
† - Defunct clubs.

References

External links
Lithuanian Football Federation - Current Cup news and results.
RSSSF - Lithuanian Cup History.

 
National association football cups
1